Yakınca (formerly Kileyik) is a town in Yeşilyurt district of Malatya Province, Turkey. It is situated between Malatya and Yeşilyurt on the Turkish state highway . It is almost merged to Yeşilyurt and only  from Malatya. The population of Yakınca is 10,943  as of 2011. According to mayor's page, the town was founded by a Turkmen tribe during the Dulkadir Beylik era (ca. 15th century). In 1964, it was declared a seat of township. The traditional town economy depended on handworks, especially straw mat and basket production, but later, apricot, hickory nut, and mulberry cultivation superseded the traditional handworks.

References

Populated places in Malatya Province
Towns in Turkey
Yeşilyurt District